Girl in Progress is a 2012 American drama film directed by Patricia Riggen, written by Hiram Martinez, and starring Eva Mendes, Matthew Modine, Patricia Arquette, Eugenio Derbez, and introducing Cierra Ramirez in her film debut as Ansiedad Gutierrez. It tells the story of a 14-year-old girl living with a busy mother who ends up acting like a grown-up and going through different tasks on her personal list. The film received a limited release on May 11, 2012. The film received the Favorite Movie Award at the 2012 ALMA Awards, which honors the accomplishments made by Hispanics in film, television, and music. Cierra Ramirez won the Favorite Movie Actress Supporting Role Award.

Plot
Grace Gutierrez is a single mom raising her teenage daughter Ansiedad. Grace is busy juggling work, bills, and her relationship with the married Dr. Harford, leaving Ansiedad to take care of herself as well as her mother most of the time.

When Ansiedad's English teacher Ms. Armstrong inspires her with coming-of-age lessons, Ansiedad decides it's time to rebel and grow up quickly so she will finally be mature enough to move out. She creates a list of tasks she must complete to reach her big goal: run away to New York.

Her first task is to remind everyone that she is a good girl – she signs up for her school's chess team and wins a match, and goes to a nursing home and regularly visits an old woman who Ansiedad names 'Maud'.

Next, Ansiedad must befriend the most popular girl in school namd Valerie. After much humiliation and bribery, Ansiedad successfully completes this task, but is forced to betray her best friend Tavita to make this happen, calling her fat and useless. Tavita begins to cry from Ansiedad's harsh comments and runs off to her boyfriend Ferguson. Ansiedad witnesses Ferguson harshly breaking up with Tavita, telling her that what they do in his basement will never mean they will be together. After Ferguson storms away, a crying Tavita tells Ansiedad that she was never there for her and that she hates her.

Ansiedad moves onto her next tasks, requiring her to have her first kiss and lose her virginity. For these tasks, she targets one of the most popular boys in school, the so-called womanizer Trevor. She confirms that he'll be at a particular party that night, then asks him to take her virginity there. He agrees, and they kiss awkwardly. Ansiedad checks "first kiss" off her list, disappointing Trevor, who thought that she might have liked him. At the party, Trevor takes Ansiedad to an upstairs bedroom, much to Valerie's anger. Locking the door, Trevor tells Ansiedad that he thinks she's pretty, but she tells him off for being nice to her. Trevor then tells Ansiedad that he only acts as a womanizer to bug his dad, but Ansiedad tells him she doesn't care. As she strips down and gets into bed, Ansiedad realizes how scared she is, changing her mind when a naked Trevor emerges from the bathroom. She quickly dresses and runs out where Valerie stops her and calls her a slut. The party guests refuse to believe Ansiedad's protests that she and Trevor didn't have sex which is made worse when Trevor yells out that they did. Ansiedad runs home, crying out for her mother, who is not home. She trashes the house in anger and cries until the next morning.

Grace had fallen asleep at the house of her co-worker Mission Impossible who is in love with Grace. She wakes in the morning to find Mission gone. She hurries to work and finds that someone has robbed the family-owned business' money, which means they will be closing down. Grace finds Mission in the back of the restaurant and he tells her he stole the money so Grace could pay Ansiedad's tuition. Grace tells him what an idiot he is and he promises to return the money.

When Grace visits Ms. Armstrong about Ansiedad, she learns what she has been doing and Ms. Armstrong reprimands Grace for her negligence. Ansiedad has boarded a bus to New York only to be stopped by her mother. Ansiedad and Grace argue, but Grace stops Ansiedad by saying "I don't want what happened to your friend to happen to you". Ansiedad asks what happened and Grace says that Tavita took weight pills and almost died. Ansiedad and Grace hug each other and wait at Tavita's house to see how she's doing.

Ms. Armstrong gives Ansiedad's class their last assignment for the year: write a conclusion about coming of age stories. A series of shots show that Mission returns the money, Ansiedad starts to dress and act like a normal 14-year-old, and Grace watches Ansiedad play chess and embarrasses her with enthusiastic cheering even though Ansiedad's smile shows she is happy that Grace is there.

Ansiedad apologizes to Tavita who hugs her. When Tavita asks her if she wants to hang out, but Ansiedad smiles and says that her mom is waiting for her. Grace and Ansiedad then board a city bus home.

Cast
 Eva Mendes as Grace Gutierrez, a woman who considers herself a hard working mother, but Ansiedad begs to differ because Grace is never home when Ansiedad needs her and she puts herself before her daughter.
 Matthew Modine as Dr. Harford, Grace's boyfriend who is a gynecologist and a married man.
 Cierra Ramirez as Ansiedad "Ann" Gutierrez, is a hardworking 14-year-old girl who is never noticed by her mother and plots to runaway and start her adulthood young.
 Patricia Arquette as Ms. Armstrong, Ansiedad's English teacher.
 Eugenio Derbez as Mission Impossible, a co-worker of Grace who sympathizes her plight.
 Raini Rodriguez as Tavita, Ansiedad's best friend.
 Russell Peters as Emile
 Brenna O'Brien as Valerie, a popular girl that Ansiedad befriends.
 Landon Liboiron as Trevor, a popular womanizing student.
 Anna Maria Estrada as Tavita's Mom
 Kendall Cross as Alice Hartford
 Blu Mankuma as Principal
 Rady Panov as Ferguson, Tavita's boyfriend.
 Colin Foo as Lo Mein
 Patti Allan as Woman
 Lossen Chambers as Lady Customer

Reception
On Rotten Tomatoes the film has an approval rating 33% based on reviews from 46 critics. The website's consensus stating: "Despite a well-intentioned and novel premise, Girl in Progress is plagued by jarring tonal shifts and does little to break its characters out of cliches." On Metacritic it has a score of 45 out of 100, based on reviews from 17 critics, indicating "mixed or average reviews".

Awards

References

External links
 

2012 drama films
American coming-of-age drama films
2010s Spanish-language films
Films directed by Patricia Riggen
Films scored by Christopher Lennertz
Films shot in Connecticut
Films shot in Massachusetts
Lionsgate films
Films about mother–daughter relationships
2010s English-language films
2010s American films